Binakle is a type of steamed rice cake originating from the Ifugao province of the Philippines. It is made from glutinous rice (diket) that is pounded into a paste, wrapped in banana or rattan leaves, and steamed. Variants may also add sesame seeds or sweet potato. They are popularly eaten on special occasions or as a snack. Uncooked binakle, along with rice wine (baya), are common offerings to the bulul ancestor spirits in Ifugao rituals.

See also

 Binaki
 Suman
 Nilupak

References

External links

Philippine rice dishes
Philippine desserts
Glutinous rice dishes
Rice cakes